Gymnopilus decoratus is a species of mushroom in the family Hymenogastraceae.

See also

List of Gymnopilus species

External links
Gymnopilus decoratus at Index Fungorum

decoratus
Taxa named by William Alphonso Murrill